David Knowles may refer to:

David Knowles (cricketer) (born 1948), New Zealand cricketer
David Knowles (footballer) (1941–2011), English footballer
David Knowles (scholar) (1896–1974), English Benedictine monk and historian
Davy Knowles (born 1987), British blues guitarist and singer

See also
William David Knowles (1908–2000), Canadian politician